Orestes Ojeda (January 3, 1956 − July 27, 2021) was a Filipino actor in movies and television.

Career
Born Luis C. Pagalilauan at Cagayan Valley, he was 17 years old when he was persuaded by director Joey Gosiengfiao to join show business. He was formally introduced as a supporting actor in Zoom, Zoom, Superman!, starring Ariel Ureta in 1973. He also appeared in Sunugin Ang Samar (1974), Isang Gabi, Tatlong Babae! (1974), May Isang Tsuper Ng Taksi (1975) Ang Boyfriend Kong Baduy (1976) and Divino (1976). He played the lead role as a priest in Pagsambang Bayan (1977).

He was also in the cast of National Artist Ishmael Bernal's 1980 classic Manila By Night, the 1983 heavy drama Broken Marriage and the 1986 melodrama The Graduates. He worked with Lino Brocka in the 1977 Metro Manila Film Festival entry Inay playing one of Alicia Vergel's children. In 1985, he did the Peque Gallaga opus Scorpio Nights, which tells the story of a college student (played by Daniel Fernando) who had an affair with an unfaithful wife (Anna Marie Gutierrez). This wife is married to a night-shift security guard (played by Ojeda). He starred in Dingding Lang Ang Pagitan (1986) with Maria Isabel Lopez.

He appeared in the Aubrey Miles horror-flick Sanib in 2003, and starred with Vilma Santos in Dekada '70 (2002) and Susan Roces in Mano Po 2: My Home (2003).

He also appeared in more than 115 movies and television shows.

Personal life
He was a Philippine School of Business Administration alumnus. He was a varsity basketball player in college and was bound to become a professional basketball player before he decided to become an actor.

In between acting assignments, he painted and managed an art gallery.

Death
Ojeda died on July 27, 2021, at the age of 65, due to pancreatic cancer.

Filmography

Film

Television

Selected filmography
Kuya (2004)
Sanib (2003)
Pistolero (2002)
Hesus Rebolusyunaryo (2002)
Masikip Na Ang Mundo Mo, Labrador (2001)
Oras Na Para Lumaban (2001)
Katayan (2000)
Most Wanted (2000)
Eksperto: Ako Ang Sasagupa! (2000)
Markado (1999)
Sige, Subukan Mo (1998)
Babae Sa Dalampasigan (1997)
Bocaue Pagoda Tragedy (1995)
Binibini Ng Aking Panaginip (1994)
Aguinaldo (1993)
Sinungaling Mong Puso (1992)
Shotgun Banjo: Mahal na Mahal Kita (1992)
Big Boy Bato: Kilabot ng Kankaloo (1992)
Maging Sino Ka Man (1991)
Hindi Kita Iiwanang Buhay: Kapitan Paile (1990)
Walang Piring Ang Katarungan (1990)
SGT. Patalinhug C.I.S. (1990)
Beautiful Girl (1990)
Moises Platon (1989)
Walang Panginoon (1989)
Diligin Ng Suka Ang Uhaw Na Lumpia (1987)
Dingding Lang Ang Pagitan (1986)
Tender Age (1984)
Broken Marriage (1983)
Sisang Tabak (1981)
Kambal Sa Uma (1979)
Mga Paru-parong Ligaw (1978)
Huwag Hamakin Hostess (1978)
Pang Umaga, Pang Tanghali, Pang Gabi (1977)
Ang Boyfriend Kong Baduy (1976)
Lulubog Lilitaw Sa Ilalim Ng Tulay (1975)
Sunugin ang Samar (1974)

References

External links

1956 births
2021 deaths
ABS-CBN personalities
Filipino male film actors
People from Cagayan
Filipino male television actors